Arthur Laurence Rook  (26 May 1921 – 30 September 1989) was an English equestrian and Olympic champion. He won a team gold medal in eventing at the 1956 Summer Olympics in Stockholm for United Kingdom. He became European champion in 1953.

Rook was an officer in the British army, the Royal Horse Guards, and served in Egypt and Italy during the Second World War. He received the Military Cross in 1944.

References

1921 births
1989 deaths
Olympic equestrians of Great Britain
British male equestrians
Equestrians at the 1952 Summer Olympics
Equestrians at the 1956 Summer Olympics
English Olympic medallists
Olympic gold medallists for Great Britain
British event riders
British Army personnel of World War II
Royal Horse Guards officers
Recipients of the Military Cross
Olympic medalists in equestrian
Medalists at the 1956 Summer Olympics